Bidorpitia ferruginata is a species of moth of the family Tortricidae. It is found in Ecuador in the provinces of Pastaza and Napo.

The wingspan is about 18 mm for males and 23–24 mm for females. The ground colour of the forewings is cream ferruginous with ferruginous suffusions and slightly darker diffuse strigulation (fine streaks) in the dorsal area. The markings are ferruginous. The hindwings are pale brownish orange.

Etymology
The species name is derived from Latin ferruginus (meaning rust coloured, ferruginous).

References

Moths described in 2007
Euliini
Moths of South America
Taxa named by Józef Razowski